Benjamin W. Friend (January 30, 1912 – November 18, 1953) was an American football player who played as a tackle in the National Football League (NFL) for one season with the Cleveland Rams in 1939. He played in ten games for the team and started in four of them. He attended Louisiana State University, where he played college football for the LSU Tigers football team. In 1937 he was selected by the Associated Press to its All-Southeastern Conference third-team. In 1938, he served as team captain.

References

External links

American football tackles
LSU Tigers football players
Cleveland Rams players
1912 births
1953 deaths